Bjørn G. Gjerstrøm (born in Oslo in 1939, deceased 8 May 2017) was a Norwegian contemporary composer.
From an early age, Gjerstrøm would receive musical impulses from his parents, the composer Gunnar Gjerstrøm and music teacher Elsa Gjerstrøm. His mother began teaching him on the piano from the age of 4-5. He completed his first composition at the age of 9. At the age of twelve, his first compositions, five piano pieces that he performed on Norwegian and Swedish radio, were published by Norsk Notestikk & Forlag.

In the 60s, Gjerstrøm studied with Trygve Lindeman and Conrad Baden at the Music Conservatory in Oslo, where he followed classes in music theory, harmony and composition. He also studied piano with Waldemar Alme and Ivar Johnsen. From 1969 to 1976 he studied composition with Hallvard Johnsen. 
Gjerstrøm’s list of works encompasses film scores, orchestral works, chamber music as well as solo pieces for flute, oboe, guitar and accordion. Gjerstrøm has also penned songs for poems by Peter R. Holm, Stein Mehren, Arnulf Øverland and Elsa Gjerstrøm.

Key Gjerstrøm works includes Concerto for piano and orchestra Op.7, premiered in 1983 by pianist Kjell Bækkelund and the Oslo Philharmonic Orchestra with conductor Per Dreier. The Stavanger Symphony Orchestra has performed the work on later occasions in Stavanger and Bergen. With composer Greta Jordhøy, Gjerstrøm has performed on a number of occasions with his own works at venues in Oslo and Heggedal.

Production

Selected works
 Stringquartet, No. 1, Op. 47 (2004)
 Nocturne : Hommage á Poulenc, Op. 41 (2001)
 Ved havet, op. 5 (1996)
 Konsert for obo og strykere, op. 17 (1986)
 Konsert for klaver og orkester op. 7 (1983)
 Camara de Lobos, op. 8 (1974)

Discography
 Øyvind Aase, Two Composers - Two Generations (1996)
 Kjell Bækkelund, 20Th Century Bækkelund (1996)

References

External links
List of works supplied by the National Library of Norway

1939 births
21st-century classical composers
Norwegian contemporary classical composers
Norwegian male classical composers
Living people
21st-century Norwegian male musicians